The Workers' Defense League is an American socialist organization devoted to promoting labor rights. The group was founded on August 29, 1936 with the endorsement of Norman Thomas, six-time presidential candidate of the Socialist Party of America. The WDL described itself as a "militant, politically nonpartisan organization which would devote itself exclusively to the protection of workers' rights". Its officers included Thomas, David Clendenin, George S. Counts, Pauli Murray, and Joe Felmet. Philosopher Richard Rorty's parents were active with the WDL when he was a child, and he acted as an errand boy for the group. Harry Fleischman acted as the group's chairman for twenty-five years.

During World War II, the WDL supported war resisters, fought for desegregation of the armed forces, and opposed Japanese American internment. The group also took on the case of Odell Waller, a Virginia sharecropper sentenced to death in 1940 for killing his white landlord. Arguing that the landlord had cheated Waller and that he had in any case acted in self-defense, the WDL raised money for Waller's defense, lobbied for the commutation of his sentence, and mounted a nationwide publicity campaign on his behalf. The effort was unsuccessful, and Waller was executed on July 2, 1942.

In the 1960s, the organization worked to integrate minorities and women into traditionally white male labor unions, though with little success.

Archival collections 
The Workers' Defense League Records are housed at the Walter P. Reuther Library. The collection spans from 1936-1965 and consists of correspondence, news clippings, speeches, trial briefs and transcripts, press releases, and pamphlets and leaflets. The collection documents the Worker's Defense League's efforts to secure justice for labor organizers, victims of racial and economic discrimination, conscientious objectors, and government critics through established, legal processes.

References

Bibliography

External links

Organizations established in 1936
Socialism in the United States
1936 establishments in the United States